The 2022 Alsco Uniforms 300 was the thirteenth stock car race of the 2022 NASCAR Xfinity Series and the 45th iteration of the event. The race was held on Saturday, May 28, 2022, in Concord, North Carolina at Charlotte Motor Speedway, a  permanent quad-oval racetrack. The race was contested over 200 laps. At race's end, Josh Berry, driving for JR Motorsports, took the win, after an exciting battle with teammate Justin Allgaier with 80 laps to go. This was Berry's 4th career Xfinity Series win, and his second of the season. To fill out the podium, Ty Gibbs of Joe Gibbs Racing and Sam Mayer of JR Motorsports would finish second and third, respectively.

Background 
Charlotte Motor Speedway is a motorsport complex located in Concord, North Carolina,  outside Charlotte. The complex features a  quad oval track that hosts NASCAR racing including the prestigious Coca-Cola 600 on Memorial Day weekend, and the Bank of America Roval 400. The speedway was built in 1959 by Bruton Smith and is considered the home track for NASCAR with many race teams located in the Charlotte area. The track is owned and operated by Speedway Motorsports with Greg Walter as track president.

The  complex also features a state-of-the-art  drag racing strip, ZMAX Dragway. It is the only all-concrete, four-lane drag strip in the United States and hosts NHRA events. Alongside the drag strip is a state-of-the-art clay oval that hosts dirt racing including the World of Outlaws finals among other popular racing events.

Entry list 

 (R) denotes rookie driver.
 (i) denotes driver who are ineligible for series driver points.

Practice 
The only 30-minute practice session was held on Friday, May 27, at 3:30 PM EST.

Qualifying 
Qualifying was held on Friday, May 27, at 4:00 PM EST. Since Charlotte Motor Speedway is an oval track, the qualifying system used is a single-car, one-lap system with only one round. Whoever sets the fastest time in the round wins the pole.

Race results 
Stage 1 Laps: 45

Stage 2 Laps: 45

Stage 3 Laps: 110

Standings after the race 

Drivers' Championship standings

Note: Only the first 12 positions are included for the driver standings.

References 

2022 NASCAR Xfinity Series
NASCAR races at Charlotte Motor Speedway
Alsco Uniforms 300 (Charlotte)
2022 in sports in North Carolina